Gian Maria Volonté (9 April 1933 – 6 December 1994) was an Italian actor and activist, remembered for his versatility as a performer, his outspoken left-wing leanings, and fiery temper on- and off-screen. He is perhaps most famous outside Italy for his roles in four Spaghetti Western films: Ramón Rojo in Sergio Leone's A Fistful of Dollars (1964) and El Indio in Leone's For a Few Dollars More (1965), El Chuncho Munoz in Damiano Damiani's A Bullet for the General (1966) and Professor Brad Fletcher in Sergio Sollima's Face to Face (1967).

In Italy and much of Europe, he was notable for his roles in high-profile social dramas depicting the political and social stirrings of Italian and European society in the 1960s and 1970s, including four films directed by Elio Petri – We Still Kill the Old Way (1967), Investigation of a Citizen Above Suspicion (1970), The Working Class Goes to Heaven (1971) and Todo modo (1976). He is also recognized for his performances in Jean-Pierre Melville's Le Cercle Rouge (1970), Giuliano Montaldo's Sacco & Vanzetti (1971) and Francesco Rosi's Christ Stopped at Eboli (1979).

Among other accolades, Volonté won two David di Donatello Awards and three Nastro d'Argento Awards. He won the Best Actor Award at the 36th Cannes Film Festival for The Death of Mario Ricci (1983), and the Silver Bear at the 37th Berlin International Film Festival for The Moro Affair (1986). Director Francisco Rosi said that he "stole the soul of his characters".

Early life 
Volonté was born in Milan but grew up in Turin. His father Mario was a fascist officer from Saronno (province of Varese), who in 1944 was in command of the Brigata Nera of Chivasso, near Turin. His mother, Carolina Bianchi, belonged to a wealthy Milanese industrial family, and his younger brother Claudio was an actor as well. He went to Rome to train for an acting career at the Accademia Nazionale di Arte Drammatica Silvio D'Amico, which he left in 1957. He had a brief career in television and acting in Shakespeare and Goldoni plays on the stage, before establishing his film career.

Career 
Volonté made his debut in 1960 in Sotto dieci bandiere, directed by Duilio Coletti. Just four years later, he played "Ramón Rojo" in A Fistful of Dollars (1964), and "El Indio" in For a Few Dollars More (1965), both for cash reasons as he did not consider either role serious. Both films were directed by the then-unknown Sergio Leone, and Volonté's roles in them would bring him his greatest recognition from American audiences. He played Carlo Levi in Christ Stopped at Eboli (1979), which was based on Levi's autobiographical account of his years in internal exile in Aliano, Southern Italy, in the 1930s. Volonté played the memorable role of the Bandito-turned-guerrilla, El Chuncho, in A Bullet for the General (1966).

Volonté's performances as memorable but neurotic characters, or as a gifted leader of brigands or revolutionaries, together with the unexpected, worldwide success of the films, gave him international fame. Volonté had already played comedies, including A cavallo della tigre (1961) by Luigi Comencini, and confirmed his versatility in L'armata Brancaleone (1966). However, he found his main dimension in dramatic roles for Banditi a Milano (1968), by Carlo Lizzani, Sbatti il mostro in prima pagina (1972) by Marco Bellocchio, La Classe operaia va in paradiso (1972) by his friend Elio Petri, and Il sospetto (1975) by Francesco Maselli.

In 1968, Volonté won a Silver Ribbon as best actor for A ciascuno il suo, also directed by Elio Petri. Volonté received the same award for two other performances: Petri's Indagine su un cittadino al di sopra di ogni sospetto (1971, winner of an Academy Award as best foreign film), considered by many to be his finest; and in The Abyss (1989).

In 1983 he won the award for Best Actor at the 1983 Cannes Film Festival for La Mort de Mario Ricci. Four years later, at the 37th Berlin International Film Festival, he won the Silver Bear for Best Actor for Il caso Moro. 1988 Cannes Film Festival Official Selection, remarkable play as a Renaissance physician in The Abyss by André Delvaux from Marguerite Yourcenar's famous novel. In 1990, Volonté was named Best European Actor for Porte aperte. In 1991, at the Venice Film Festival, he won a Golden Lion for his career as a whole. Volonté played numerous roles outside Italy.

Personal life 
Volonté  was a strong political activist and known for his pro-Communist leanings. In 1981, he helped Oreste Scalzone to flee from capture in Italy to Denmark. He was the partner of Italian actress Carla Gravina for almost 10 years after they met when they played Romeo and Juliet in a theatre production in 1960. The two had a daughter Giovanna, born in the early 1960s. Actress Angelica Ippolito was his companion from 1977 until his death in 1994.

Death 
Volonté died from a heart attack at the age of 61 in 1994 at Florina, Greece, during the filming of Ulysses' Gaze, directed by Theo Angelopoulos. Actor Erland Josephson replaced him in the role. Volonté's grave is in a small cemetery on the Sardinian island of La Maddalena, according to his wishes.

Selected filmography 

 Under Ten Flags (1960, directed by Duilio Coletti) as Samuel Braunstein
 Girl with a Suitcase (1961, directed by Valerio Zurlini) as Piero Benotti
 Journey Beneath the Desert (1961, directed by Edgar G. Ulmer) as Tarath
 Hercules and the Conquest of Atlantis (1961, directed by Vittorio Cottafavi) as Re di Sparta
 On the Tiger's Back (1961, directed by Luigi Comencini) as Papaleo
 A Man for Burning (1962, directed by Paolo and Vittorio Taviani and Valentino Orsini) as Salvatore
 The Four Days of Naples (1962, directed by Nanni Loy) as Stimolo (uncredited)
 Noche de verano (1963, directed by Jorge Grau) as Alberto Suárez
 Il terrorista (1963, directed by Gianfranco De Bosio) as Braschi, l'ingeniere
 A Fistful of Dollars (credited as "Johnny Wels") (1964, directed by Sergio Leone) as Ramón Rojo
 The Magnificent Cuckold (1965, directed by Antonio Pietrangeli) as The Councillor
 For a Few Dollars More (1965, directed by Sergio Leone) as El Indio
 Seasons of Our Love (1966, directed by Florestano Vancini) as Leonardo Varzi
 Wake Up and Die (1966, directed by Carlo Lizzani) as Inspector Moroni
 L'armata Brancaleone (1966, directed by Mario Monicelli) as Teofilatto dei Leonzi
 La strega in amore (1966, directed by Damiano Damiani) as Fabrizio
 A Gangstergirl (1966, directed by Frans Weisz)
 A Bullet for the General (1967, directed by Damiano Damiani) as El Chuncho Munoz
 We Still Kill the Old Way (1967, directed by Elio Petri) as Prof. Paolo Laurana
 Faccia a faccia (1967, directed by Sergio Sollima) as Professor Brad Fletcher
 The Seven Cervi Brothers (1968, directed by Gianni Puccini)
 Bandits in Milan (1968, directed by Carlo Lizzani) as Pietro 'Piero' Cavallero
  (1968, directed by )
 The Bandit (1969, directed by Carlo Lizzani) as Gramigna
 Under the Sign of Scorpio (1969, directed by Paolo and Vittorio Taviani) as Renno
 Investigation of a Citizen Above Suspicion (1970, directed by Elio Petri) as "Il Dottore", the Police Inspector
 Wind from the East (1970, directed by Jean-Luc Godard and the Dziga Vertov Group) as Le ranger nordiste
 Many Wars Ago (1970, directed by Francesco Rosi) as Lt. Ottolenghi
 Le Cercle Rouge (1970, directed by Jean-Pierre Melville) as Vogel
 Sacco e Vanzetti (1971, directed by Giuliano Montaldo) as Bartolomeo Vanzetti
 The Working Class Goes to Heaven (1971, directed by Elio Petri) as Lulù Massa
 The Mattei Affair (1972, directed by Francesco Rosi) as Enrico Mattei
 Plot (1972, directed by Yves Boisset) as Sadiel – un leader progresste maghrebin
 Sbatti il mostro in prima pagina (1972, directed by Marco Bellocchio) as Bizanti
 Lucky Luciano (1973, directed by Francesco Rosi) as Charles 'Lucky' Luciano
 Giordano Bruno (1973, directed by Giuliano Montaldo) as Giordano Bruno
 The Suspect (1975, directed by Francesco Maselli) as Emilio
 Letters from Marusia (1976, directed by Miguel Littín) as Gregorio
 Todo modo (1976, directed by Elio Petri) as M.
 Io ho paura (1977, directed by Damiano Damiani) as Brigadiere Ludovico Graziano
 Christ Stopped at Eboli (1979, directed by Francesco Rosi) as Carlo Levi
 Ogro (1979, directed by Gillo Pontecorvo) as Izarra
 Stark System (1980, directed by Armenia Balducci) as Stark
 The Lady of the Camellias (1981, directed by Mauro Bolognini) as Plessis
  (1982, TV miniseries, directed by Mauro Bolognini) as Count Mosca
 La Mort de Mario Ricci (1983, directed by Claude Goretta) as Bernard Fontana
 Il caso Moro (1986, directed by Giuseppe Ferrara) as Aldo Moro
 Chronicle of a Death Foretold (1987, directed by Francesco Rosi) as Dr. Cristo Bedoya
 Un ragazzo di Calabria (1987, directed by Luigi Comencini) as Felice
 The Abyss (1988, directed by André Delvaux) as Zénon
 Pestalozzi's Mountain (1989, directed by Peter von Gunten) as Pestalozzi
 Tre colonne in cronaca (1990, directed by Carlo Vanzina) as Alberto Landolfi
 Open Doors (1990, directed by Gianni Amelio) as Judge Vito Di Francesco
 Una storia semplice (1991, directed by Emidio Greco) as Carmelo Franzò
 Funes, a Great Love (1993, directed by Raúl de la Torre) as Bergama
 Banderas, the Tyrant (1993, directed by José Luis García Sánchez) as Santos Banderas (final film role)

References

External links 

 
 
 Giovanni Savastano: "Gian Maria Volonté. Recito dunque sono" Edizioni Clichy, 2018

1933 births
1994 deaths
20th-century Italian male actors
Italian male film actors
Male actors from Milan
Male Spaghetti Western actors
Male Western (genre) film actors
Accademia Nazionale di Arte Drammatica Silvio D'Amico alumni
Cannes Film Festival Award for Best Actor winners
European Film Awards winners (people)
David di Donatello winners
Nastro d'Argento winners
Silver Bear for Best Actor winners
Italian communists